The Geo-Surfaces Field at the ULM Softball Complex is the home stadium for the Louisiana–Monroe Warhawks softball team. Located on the campus of the University of Louisiana at Monroe, the area the complex is built on was the former home of the Louisiana–Monroe Warhawks baseball team until the early 1980s. The complex utilizes bleacher seating, and has a capacity for over 500 people, as well as room for additional seating space along both foul lines.

The stadium was the site of the Southland Conference softball tournament in 1985 and 1997.

References

External links

Louisiana–Monroe Warhawks softball
College softball venues in the United States
Softball venues in Louisiana
Sports venues in Monroe, Louisiana
Sports venues completed in 1980
1980 establishments in Louisiana